Clap Hanz, Ltd. (株式会社クラップハンズ Kabushiki-Gaisha Kurappu Hanzu) is a video game developer located in Japan. It is a second party company with strong ties with Sony Computer Entertainment and is the developer of the Everybody's Golf series (formerly known as Hot Shots Golf in North America). The company was established in 1998 and is headed by Masashi Muramori

Games developed

References

External links
 

Video game companies established in 1998
Video game companies of Japan
Video game development companies
Japanese companies established in 1998
Companies based in Yokohama
Everybody's Golf